Homala integricollis is a species of beetles in the family Tenebrionidae. It can be found in East Africa.

References

 Martin L. Linell, List of coleoptera collected on the Tana river and on the Joaibene range, East Africa, by Mr William Astor Chanleij and Lieutenant Ludwig Von Hohnel, with descriptions of new genera and species (1894)
 Tenebrionidae at Cuic.entomology
 Organism Names
 Universal Biological Indexer

Beetles described in 1884
Tenebrionidae
Fauna of East Africa